The Coal Glen mine disaster was a series of coal mine explosions that occurred on May 27, 1925, in Coal Glen, Chatham County, North Carolina, United States. At least 53 miners died in the explosion, making it the deadliest industrial disaster in North Carolina's history. The mine was permanently closed in 1953.

Background 

The Deep River Coal Field is the largest coal deposit in North Carolina. Geologists believe that local residents made use of the coal as early as the 1770s. Commercial exploitation of the coal field began in the 1850s, with mines dug near the settlement of Egypt (renamed Cumnock in 1895) which were connected to the Cape Fear River port of Fayetteville by rail. In about 1921 the Carolina Coal Company dug a mine on the former location of the village of Farmville near the village of Coal Glen and about eight miles northwest of the city of Sanford.

The Coal Glen mine was developed as a slope mine with an entrance which descended below the ground at an incline. Interior passages were held up by four-foot-tall hardwood timbers. Most miners crawled through the mine, with few places where they could stand upright. Carts were hauled up and down the main slope by a powered hoist. Down in the mine, mules which were kept in an underground stable were used to move carts. Coal would be placed onto the carts which were brought to the surface to a tipple, where the coal would be sorted and separated from slate and loaded onto railway cars. By 1923, the mine was producing 200 tons per day.

The Coal Glen mine attracted rats, which were welcomed by the workers, who observed them for signs of danger, similar to canaries used in other digs; if rats vacated the mine, miners viewed this as a sign of a natural gas buildup. The site was equipped with a ventilation system meant to diffuse any gas buildup. On the morning of May 26, 1925, one miner noticed that rats were fleeing the mine shaft. Fearing danger, he and several workers quit. That day one worker was weakened by coal dust and firedamp, possibly indicating ventilation problems with the mine. The superintendent was verbally informed of this.

Explosion 
At about 9:30 a.m. on May 27, 1925 the mine at Coal Glen exploded. The blast, likely caused by coal dust or natural gas, killed all workers underground at the time and was felt in the nearby town. Mine superintendent Howard Butler saw smoke coming through a ventilation fan at the surface, and took mechanic Joe Richardson down the main slope to investigate. They found six men lying unconscious behind a door to one of the passages and carried them outside. Butler then instructed surface workers to close the mine's blast door and ventured further into the mine with Richardson. At about 9:55, when they were 150 feet into the mine, a second explosion occurred, showering them with debris and injuring Butler. The two crawled back to the surface before a final explosion occurred at about 10:10. The third explosion collapsed part of the shaft, blocking passage in and out of the mine.

Response and effects 

The day of the disaster, the United States Bureau of Mines dispatched a special railway car from Thomas, West Virginia carrying special rescue equipment to North Carolina. It arrived in Raleigh the following day. North Carolina Governor Angus Wilton McLean ordered troops from Fort Bragg to control the gathering crowd at the site and authorized rescue equipment to be flown into Sanford. Rescue efforts were led by State Adjutant-General John Van Bokkelen Metts and a group of engineers. Civic organizations from Sanford helped establish a first aid station at the mine surface.

The Chatham County recorder of deeds issued 53 death certificates in relation to the event, but the real death total is not known. About 70 miners were working the shift, and contemporary newspaper reports offered higher counts. Local publications reported that several bodies were recovered in the months after the explosion and quietly buried. Seven workers scheduled for the shift were not present at the time of the explosion. Researcher Forest Hazel wrote that since many of the men working in the mines were unmarried, it is possible that some were not identified as missing. About half the men killed were white, the others black. Several mules were also killed in the explosion, and their remains were left underground.

Federal and state investigators and the management of the Carolina Coal Company all sought to discover the cause of the explosions. Bureau of Mines investigators determined that the explosions were caused by a blasting charge. Two charges had been set, and one failed to fully detonate. The single functional charge was not strong enough to collapse the coal rock; it instead blew out the contents of the drill hole in which it had been placed and scattered dust that was subsequently ignited. The state investigation was conducted by the office of the Commissioner of Labor, which was responsible for all mine inspections in the state. The state affirmed the conclusions of the federal investigation while further stating that the blasting charges had been improperly placed in violation of the state's mining regulations. Carolina Coal Company board member Bion Butler did not believe that gas was related to the blast.

Due to the deaths from the disaster, the adult population of Coal Glen shrunk by about half, while 38 women were widowed and 79 children were rendered fatherless. McLean asked the public to raise $35,000 in relief funds and requested the American Red Cross to provide assistance to victims. Upset with this limited response, a delegation from the city of Sanford went to Raleigh to meet with him, and convinced him to appoint a committee to coordinate a statewide fundraising campaign and offer advice to the Red Cross. John R. McQueen, the president of the Carolina Coal Company, placed the corporation into receivership and arranged for payouts to the impacted families. No lawsuits were filed against the company in connection to the disaster.

Legacy 
The Coal Glen mine explosion was the deadliest industrial disaster in North Carolina history. In part due to the disaster, the North Carolina General Assembly passed a workers' compensation law in 1929 with the encouragement of the Department of Labor. The Carolina Coal Company went bankrupt in 1930, but the mine was reopened in 1943 and remained in operation until 1953. The shaft was later flooded by the Deep River, and the mine entrance sits on land owned by the General Timber Corporation. A historical marker commemorating the event was dedicated in 2017 at U.S. 15-501 and Walter Bright Road.

References

Works cited 
 
 
 

Chatham County, North Carolina
Coal mining disasters in North Carolina
1925 mining disasters
1925 in North Carolina
1925 disasters in the United States